The Men's 100 metre freestyle event at the 2015 African Games took place on 8 September 2015 at Kintele Aquatic Complex.

Schedule
All times are Congo Standard Time (UTC+01:00)

Records
Prior to the competition, the existing world and championship records were as follows.

Results

Heats 
The heats were held on 8 September.

Final 
The final were held on 8 September.

References

External links
Official website

Swimming at the 2015 African Games